Johan Peter Koch (15 January 1870 – 13 January 1928) was a Danish captain and explorer of the Arctic dependencies of Denmark, born at Vestenskov. He was the uncle of the geologist Lauge Koch

Career
J.P. Koch participated in Amdrup's expedition to east Greenland in 1900 and was one of the general staff of the surveying expeditions to Iceland in 1903–1904.

In 1906–1908 he was a member of the ill-fated Denmark expedition led by Ludvig Mylius-Erichsen, which mapped the last pieces of the northeastern coast of Greenland. On the death of Mylius-Erichsen and two others on a long sled voyage from Danmarkshavn to Peary Land, Koch along with the Greenlander Tobias Gabrielsen searched for the lost party, and found only the Greenlander Jørgen Brønlund on whose body were recovered the charts hand drawn by Niels Peter Høeg Hagen which completed the map of Greenland.

In 1907 Koch, together with Aage Bertelsen, was reported to have first seen Fata Morgana Land, a phantom island supposedly lying between NE Greenland and Svalbard. This elusive land was allegedly seen as well by Lauge Koch from the air in 1933.

Koch later led a sled expedition across the inland ice of Greenland in 1912–13, with Alfred Wegener, Vigfús Sigurðsson, and Lars Larsen.

Honours
Koch received, among other honors, the Vega medal of the Swedish Society for Anthropology and Geography. He also became a member of the International Polar Commission.

J.P. Koch Land  in north-west Greenland was named after him. This ice-free peninsula is bounded by the Greenland Ice Sheet on the west side. There, next to the glacier, is  mountain, which is the highest mountain in this land and also the northernmost basalt mountain in Greenland. On the north side, J.P. Koch land is bounded by Upernavik Icefjord, in the west and south by Eqaluarssuit Fjord (sv). The land is about 1010 square-km in area.

The J.P. Koch Glacier was named in his honour.

Publications
 Meddelelser om Grønland, xxvi, xlvii  (50 volumes, Copenhagen, 1876–1912)

See also
Cartographic expeditions to Greenland

References 

1870 births
1928 deaths
Danish explorers
Scandinavian explorers of North America
Greenlandic polar explorers
Explorers of the Arctic